Michael Jan Hugo Kuiper (born June 7, 1989) is a Dutch mixed martial artist who most recently competed in the Light Heavyweight division. A professional competitor since 2009, he has competed for the UFC and Titan FC.

Mixed martial arts career

Early career
Kuiper comes from a judo background and holds a black belt in the discipline. He made his mixed martial arts debut in February 2009 and defeated his opponent, Ahmed Sultan, with a triangle choke. He went on to have a further six fights that same year, winning all of them in the first or second round. In 2009 he won the Belgium MMA title, and was rewarded with the MMA fighter of the year 2009.

After defeating David Marcina on November 20, 2010, he was set to return to the cage on December 4, 2010 to face Welsh boxer John Phillips at BAMMA 5: The Beast vs. Crazy Bear in Newcastle, England. But due to snowstorms in the UK the event was cancelled.

Ultimate Fighting Championship
In his UFC debut Kuiper faced Rafael Natal on February 4, 2012 at UFC 143. He lost the back-and-forth fight via unanimous decision.

Kuiper faced Jared Hamman on August 11, 2012 at UFC 150. Kuiper defeated Hamman via second-round TKO.

Kuiper was expected to face Thiago Perpetuo on January 19, 2013 at UFC on FX 7. However, Perpetuo suffered an injury and was replaced by Caio Magalhaes.  On December 27, it was announced that Magalhaes had also pulled out of the bout and that Kuiper would be shifted to UFC on Fox 6 on January 26, 2013 to face Buddy Roberts.  It was then announced on January 8 that Roberts had been forced out of the bout with an illness and was replaced by promotional newcomer Josh Janousek.  Then just days before the event, Janousek himself pulled out of the bout citing an injury.  With no time to find a suitable replacement for Kuiper, he was pulled from the event as well. This meant that 4 potential opponents for Kuiper (Perpetuo, Magalhaes, Roberts and Janousek) had all pulled out of the proposed bout.

Kuiper next faced Tom Lawlor on April 6, 2013 at UFC on Fuel TV 9. He lost via submission early in the second round.

Kuiper faced Brad Scott on October 26, 2013 at UFC Fight Night 30. He lost the fight via front choke submission in the first round, and was subsequently released from the promotion shortly after.

Titan FC
Kuiper fought fellow former UFC fighter Matt Riddle in the co-main event of Titan FC 27 on February 28, 2014. Kuiper lost by guillotine choke in the second round.

Mixed martial arts record

|-
|Loss
|align=center| 15-6
|Adrick Croes
|Submission (rear-naked choke)
|CFC 5
|
|align=center|1
|align=center|N/A
|Aruba
|Light Heavyweight debut.
|-
|Win
|align=center| 15-5
|Cristiano Machado
|Submission (rear-naked choke)
|CFC 4: Nedd vs. Grigsby
|
|align=center|1
|align=center|2:46
|Dessel, Belgium
|
|-
|Win
|align=center| 14-5
|Oktay Karatas
|TKO (punches)
|Battle Events: Amersfoort
|
|align=center|1
|align=center|4:34
|Utrecht, Netherlands
|
|-
|Loss
|align=center| 13–5
|Gregory Milliard
|TKO (punches)
|Redemption Fighting Championship 2
|
|align=center|3
|align=center|2:48
|Oranjestad, Aruba
|Kuiper missed weight by 5 lbs.
|-
|Win
|align=center| 13–4
|Lutciano Zimmerman
|KO (punches)
|Strength and Honour Championship 10
|
|align=center|1
|align=center|N/A
|Dessel, Belgium
|
|-
|Loss
|align=center| 12–4
|Matt Riddle
|Submission (guillotine choke)
|Titan Fighting Championship 27
|
|align=center|2
|align=center|2:29
|Kansas City, Kansas, United States
|
|-
|Loss
|align=center| 12–3
|Brad Scott
|Submission (standing guillotine choke)
|UFC Fight Night: Machida vs. Munoz
|
|align=center|1
|align=center|4:17
|Manchester, England, United Kingdom
|
|-
|Loss
|align=center| 12–2
|Tom Lawlor
|Submission (guillotine choke)
|UFC on Fuel TV: Mousasi vs. Latifi
|
|align=center|2
|align=center|1:05
|Stockholm, Sweden
|
|-
|Win
|align=center| 12–1
|Jared Hamman
|TKO (punches)
|UFC 150
|
|align=center|2
|align=center|2:16
|Denver, Colorado, United States
|
|-
|Loss
|align=center| 11–1
|Rafael Natal
|Decision (unanimous)
|UFC 143
|
|align=center|3
|align=center|5:00
|Las Vegas, Nevada, United States
|
|-
|Win
|align=center| 11–0
|Morris Cilfoni
|TKO (punches) 
|Milano in the Cage
|
|align=center|1
|align=center|N/A
|Milan, Lombardy, Italy
|
|-
|Win
|align=center| 10–0
|Clearance Noordzee
|KO (punches) 
|Staredown 5
|
|align=center|1
|align=center|N/A
|Deurne, Belgium
|
|-
|Win
|align=center| 9–0
|David Marcina
|TKO (punches) 
|Live 2 Fight
|
|align=center|1
|align=center|2:14
|Mallorca, Balearic Islands, Spain
|
|-
|Win
|align=center| 8–0
|Baudin Egoluev
|Submission (armbar)
|Ultimate Takedown: Brazil vs. Belgium
|
|align=center|2
|align=center|2:42
|Herstal, Belgium
|
|-
|Win
|align=center| 7–0
|Ivan Brguljan
|TKO (punches)
|One Gate 2 Far
|
|align=center|1
|align=center|N/A
|Heerlen, Netherlands
|
|-
|Win
|align=center| 6–0
|Patrice Wagemans
|KO (punch)
|Strength and Honour 5
|
|align=center|1
|align=center|0:10
|Dessel, Belgium
|
|-
|Win
|align=center| 5–0
|Bert Van Geystelen
|Submission (armbar)
|Bulls Gym Gala
|
|align=center|2
|align=center|N/A
|Putte, Belgium
|
|-
|Win
|align=center| 4–0
|Saigan Muradov
|TKO (punches)
|The Battle of Akersloot 
|
|align=center|N/A
|align=center|N/A
|Akersloot, Netherlands
|
|-
|Win
|align=center| 3–0
|Bert Van Geystelen
|Submission (armbar)
|Staredown
|
|align=center|1
|align=center|N/A
|Antwerp, Belgium
|
|-
|Win
|align=center| 2–0
|Kevin Goodliff
|Decision (unanimous)
|Battle of South 7
|
|align=center|2
|align=center|5:00
|Hoensbroek, Netherlands
|
|-
|Win
|align=center| 1–0
|Ahmed Sultan
|Submission (triangle choke)
|Outsider Cup 12
|
|align=center|2
|align=center|4:00
|Mülheim, Germany
|

References

External links
 
 

1989 births
Living people
Dutch male mixed martial artists
Middleweight mixed martial artists
Mixed martial artists utilizing judo
Mixed martial artists utilizing Brazilian jiu-jitsu
Dutch male judoka
Dutch practitioners of Brazilian jiu-jitsu
People from Goirle
Sportspeople from North Brabant
Sportspeople from Tilburg
Ultimate Fighting Championship male fighters
20th-century Dutch people
21st-century Dutch people